Cyclonic Storm Rashmi (IMD designation: BOB 05, JTWC designation: 04B) was the seventh tropical cyclone of the 2008 North Indian Ocean cyclone season and second cyclonic storm, as well as the fifth tropical cyclone in the Bay of Bengal that year. A fairly weak tropical cyclone, it caused some notable damage in Bangladesh and India.

An area of low pressure formed within the Bay of Bengal on October 24. It was designated as Depression BOB 05 the next day by the India Meteorological Department. The depression was declared a deep depression early on October 26, whilst the Joint Typhoon Warning Center designated the depression as Cyclone 04B later that day with wind speeds equivalent to a tropical storm. Later that day, the IMD upgraded the deep depression into a cyclonic storm and named it as Rashmi. Rashmi then reached both its peak one- and three-minute sustained wind speeds, as it made landfall on the Bangladesh coast late on October 26. Early the next day the JTWC issued its final advisory on Rashmi as the IMD downgraded Rashmi to a deep depression. Later that day the IMD, having noted that Rashmi had weakened rapidly, downgraded the deep depression to a well marked area of low pressure and released their final advisory.

The name Rashmi was submitted by Sri Lanka, to the World Meteorological Organisation's Tropical Cyclone Committee. Rashmi (pronounced Rush-mee) is a Sinhalese word, which means "ray of light".

Meteorological history

On October 24, 2008, an area of low pressure formed in the North Indian Ocean, within the central Bay of Bengal. Later that day the Joint Typhoon Warning Center, designated it as a Tropical Disturbance and assessed its chances of forming into a significant tropical cyclone within the next 24 hours as fair. The next day as the India Meteorological Department reported that the disturbance had intensified into a depression and assigned the number BOB 05 to the depression. The JTWC then upgraded the depression's chances of forming into a significant cyclone to Good and issued a Tropical Cyclone Formation Alert on the depression. 

Early on October 26 the IMD upgraded the depression to a deep depression, with wind speeds of 30 knots (35 mph, 55 km/h). At the same time the JTWC designated the depression as Cyclone 04B. Later that day the IMD reported that the Deep Depression had intensified into a Cyclonic Storm with it being named as Rashmi. During that evening the IMD reported that Rashmi had reached its peak 3 minute wind speeds of 40 knots, whilst the JTWC also reported that Rashmi had reached its peak 1 minute wind speeds of 45 knots. 

Early the next day the IMD reported that Rashmi had made landfall on the Bangladesh coast, near Barisal. As a result of making landfall Rashmi started to weaken rapidly by becoming a Deep Depression, early that morning before being downgraded to a well marked area of low pressure, later during the morning.

Preparations and impact

India
Five people were killed as incessant rains accompanied by winds hit the state of Meghalaya, India. The cyclone's incessant rainfall accompanied by gusty winds had caused flash floods in three districts of Assam - Kamrup, Sonitput and inundated vast tracts of land besides rendering people homeless. The flash floods occurred as neighbouring Bhutan and Arunachal Pradesh released excess waters from their reservoirs due to increased water levels caused by incessant rains for the last two days by cyclone Rashmi

Bangladesh
The Disaster Management Information Centre in Bangladesh issued cyclone warnings for various ports in Bangladesh including the Port of Mongla. As a result of these cyclone warnings, harbour activities were suspended for two days.

15 people were killed and thousands of homes were also damaged. Rashmi brought down electrical and telephone poles and uprooted trees; large areas of acres of crops were also destroyed. At least 50 fishermen were reported missing when about 15 fishing trawlers capsized offshore.

See also

 List of tropical cyclones
 Timeline of the 2008 North Indian Ocean cyclone season

References

External links
India Meteorological Department
Joint Typhoon Warning Center 

Rashmi
Rashmi
Rashmi